Namhaeicola is a Gram-negative, pleomorphic and non-motile genus of bacteria from the family of Flavobacteriaceae with one known species (Namhaeicola litoreus). Namhaeicola litoreus has been isolated from seawater from the South Sea in Korea.

References

Flavobacteria
Bacteria genera
Monotypic bacteria genera
Taxa described in 2012